Shocking may refer to:

Shocking (cooking)
Shocking (horse)
Shocking (Slaughter & the Dogs album)
Shocking (Tsu Shi Ma Mi Re album)
"Shocking", a song by Linton Kwesi Johnson from LKJ in Dub (1995)
"Shocking", a song by Catherine Wheel from Happy Days (album)